The history of Indian cuisine consists of cuisine from the Indian subcontinent, which is rich and diverse. The diverse climate in the region, ranging from deep tropical to alpine, has also helped considerably broaden the set of ingredients readily available to the many schools of cookery in India. In many cases, food has become a marker of religious and social identity, with varying taboos and preferences (for instance, a segment of the Jain population consume no roots or subterranean vegetable; see Jain vegetarianism) which has also driven these groups to innovate extensively with the food sources that are deemed acceptable.

One strong influence over Indian foods is the longstanding vegetarianism within sections of India's Hindu and Jain communities. At 31%, slightly less than a third of Indians are vegetarians.

Historic developments

Prehistory and Indus Valley Civilization exchanges with Sumeria and Mesopotamia

After 9000 BCE, a first period of indirect contacts between Fertile Crescent and Indus Valley (IV) seems to have occurred as a consequence of the Neolithic Revolution and the diffusion of agriculture. Around 7000 BCE, agriculture spread from the Fertile Crescent to the Indus Valley, and wheat and barley began to be grown. Sesame and humped cattle were domesticated in the local farming communities. Mehrgarh is one of the earliest sites with evidence of farming and herding in South Asia. Jean-François Jarrige argues for an independent origin of Mehrgarh who notes "the assumption that farming economy was introduced full-fledged from Near-East to South Asia," and the similarities between Neolithic sites from eastern Mesopotamia and the western Indus valley, which are evidence of a "cultural continuum" between those sites. But given the originality of Mehrgarh, Jarrige concludes that Mehrgarh has an earlier local background and is not a "'backwater' of the Neolithic culture of the Near East".

From circa 4500 to 1900 BC the rulers of Lower Mesopotamia were Sumerians who spoke a non-Indo-European and non-Semitic language, may have initially come from India and may have been related to the original Dravidian population of India. This appeared to historian Henry Hall as the most probable conclusion, particularly based on the portrayal of Sumerians in their own art and "how very Indian the Sumerians were in type". Recent genetic analysis of ancient Mesopotamian skeletal DNA tends to confirm a significant association that some of Sumerians might have come from IVC, and it cannot be excluded that among them were people involved in the founding of the Mesopotamian civilizations.

By 3000 BCE, turmeric, cardamom, black pepper and mustard were harvested in India.

From Around 2350 BCE the evidence for imports from the Indus to Ur in Mesopotamia have been found, as well as Clove heads which are thought to originate from the Moluccas in Maritime Southeast Asia were found in a 2nd millennium BC site in Terqa. Akkadian Empire records mention timber, carnelian and ivory as being imported from Meluhha by Meluhhan ships, Meluhha being generally considered as the Mesopotamian name for the Indus Valley Civilization.

Vedic and vegetarian Buddhist exchanges with Roman empire and influence on Southeast Asia

The ancient Hindu text Mahabharata mentions rice and vegetable cooked together, and the word "pulao" or "pallao" is used to refer to the dish in ancient Sanskrit  works, such as Yājñavalkya Smṛti. Ayurveda, ancient Indian system of wellness, deals with holistic approach to the wellness, and it includes food, dhyana {meditation} and yoga.

Thai cuisine was influenced by Indian cuisine as recorded by the Thai monk Buddhadasa Bhikku in his writing ‘India's Benevolence to Thailand’. He wrote that Thai people learned how to use spices in their food in various ways from Indians. Thais also obtained the methods of making herbal medicines (Ayurveda) from the Indians. Some plants like sarabhi of family Guttiferae, kanika or harsinghar, phikun or Mimusops elengi and bunnak or the rose chestnut etc. were brought from India.

Filipino cuisine, found throughout the Philippines archipelago, has been historically influenced by the Indian cuisine. Atchara of Philippines originated from the Indian achar, which was transmitted to the Philippines via the acar of the Indonesia, Malaysia and Brunei. Indian influences can also be noted in rice-based delicacies such as bibingka (analogous to the Indonesian bingka), puto, and puto bumbong, where the latter two are plausibly derived from the south Indian puttu, which also has variants throughout Maritime Southeast Asia (e.g. kue putu, putu mangkok). The kare-kare, more popular in Luzon, on the other hand could trace its origins from the Seven Years' War when the British occupied Manila for 2 years mostly with sepoys (Indian conscripts), who had to improvise Indian dishes given the lack of spices in the Philippines to make curry. This is said to explain the name and its supposed thick, yellow-to-orange annatto and peanut-based sauce, which alludes to a type of curry.

Cuisine exchange with Central Asian and Islamic world

Later, arrivals from Arabia, Central Asia, and centuries of trade relations and cultural exchange resulted in a significant influence on each region's cuisines, such as the adoption of the tandoor in Middle East which had originated in northwestern India.

Cuisine exchange during European colonial period

The Portuguese and British during their rule introduced cooking techniques such as baking, and foods from the New World and Europe. The new-world vegetables popular in cuisine from the Indian subcontinent include tomato, potato, sweet potatoes, peanuts, squash, and chilli. Most New world vegetables such as sweet potatoes, potatoes, Amaranth, peanuts and cassava based Sago are allowed on Hindu fasting days. Cauliflower was introduced by the British in 1822. In the late 18th/early 19th century, an autobiography of a Scottish Robert Lindsay mentions a Sylheti man called Saeed Ullah cooking a curry for Lindsay's family. This is possibly the oldest record of Indian cuisine in the United Kingdom.

Factors driving globalisation of Indian cuisine

Universal appeal
A 2019 research paper by US economist Joel Waldfogel, based on travel data from TripAdvisor, affirmed India's soft power which ranked Indian cuisine fourth most popular. Italian, Japanese & Chinese food being top 3. Indian cuisine is especially most popular in United Kingdom, South Korea, Thailand, Japan, Germany, France and US. In another 2019 survey of 25,000 people cross 34 countries, the largest fans of India cuisine who have tried it are the Indians (93%), UK (84%), Singaporeans (77%), Norwagians (75%), Australians (74%), French (71%), Finnish (71%), Malaysians (70%), Indonesians (49%), Vietnamese (44%), Thai (27%), and mainland Chinese (26%).

Unique molecular taste and richness of spices

Washington Post reported the results of a 2019 study by the researchers at the Indian Institute of Technology Jodhpur, which analysed over 2,000 popular online recipes from Tarla Dalal's portal "TarlaDalal.com" containing 200 ingredients out of the 381 known globally. Each Indian dish on average contains at least 7 ingredients. Each ingredient have average of over 50 molecular flavor compounds. Data scientists studied the numbers and amount of molecular flavor compounds shared by each ingredient combined in a dish. Western cuisine tend to pair similar molecular flavor compounds, which is why it tastes bland. On the other hand, the secret to Indian cuisine's unique and delicious appeal is that at molecular level the ingredients used in Indian dish share less molecular flavor compounds, which provides contrasting uniquely balanced taste. Indian cuisine does not uses ingredients that overlap in molecular flavor compounds, "we found that average flavor sharing in Indian cuisine was significantly lesser than expected... Each of the spices is uniquely placed in its recipe to shape the flavor sharing pattern with rest of the ingredients." The more overlap two ingredients have in terms of shared molecular flavor compounds, the less likely they are to be used in the same Indian dish.

Long and globally networked evolution that is widely ranged

Indian cuisine reflects an 8,000-year history of various groups and cultures interacting with the Indian subcontinent, leading to diversity of flavours and regional cuisines found in modern-day India. Later, trade with British and Portuguese influence added to the already diverse Indian cuisine.

Large diversity of fusion and regional variations within Indian cuisine
Another reason for the popularity of Indian cuisine is evolution of a large number of distinct diaspora and fusion Indian cuisine such as Indian Chinese cuisine (Chindian or Indian and own cuisine-Cantonese cuisine fusion), Malaysian Indian cuisine, Indian Singaporean cuisine (based on Tamil cuisine), Anglo-Indian cuisine (developed during the British Raj in India with adoption of western dishes with Indian ingredients).

Contribution of the Indian diaspora towards promoting Indian cuisine

In 2019, according to data released by United Nations, 17.5 million of overseas Indians formed the world's largest diaspora, including 3.4 million in UAE, 2.7 million in USA, and 2.4 million in Saudi Arabia. Indian migration has spread the culinary traditions of the subcontinent throughout the world. These cuisines have been adapted to local tastes, and have also affected local cuisines. Curry's international appeal has been compared to that of pizza. Indian tandoor dishes such as chicken tikka enjoy widespread popularity.

The UK's first Indian restaurant, the Hindoostanee Coffee House, opened in 1810. By 2003, there were as many as 10,000 restaurants serving Indian cuisine in England and Wales alone. According to Britain's Food Standards Agency, the Indian food industry in the United Kingdom is worth 3.2 billion pounds, accounts for two-thirds of all eating out and serves about 2.5 million customers every week. A survey by The Washington Post in 2007 stated that more than 1,200 Indian food products had been introduced into the United States since 2000.

Indian cuisine is very popular in Southeast Asia, due to the strong Hindu and Buddhist cultural influence in the region. Indian cuisine has had considerable influence on Malaysian cooking styles and also enjoys popularity in Singapore. There are numerous North and South Indian restaurants in Singapore, mostly in Little India. Singapore is also known for fusion cuisine combining traditional Singaporean cuisine with Indian influences. Fish head curry, for example, is a local creation. Indian influence on Malay cuisine dates to the 19th century. Other cuisines which borrow inspiration from Indian cooking styles include Cambodian, Lao, Filipino, Vietnamese, Indonesian, Thai, and Burmese cuisines. The spread of vegetarianism in other parts of Asia is often credited to Hindu and Buddhist practices.

Gallery

See also
 Indian cookbooks
 Ayurveda

References

Notes

Citations

 
History of Pakistani cuisine
History of food and drink
South Asian cuisine